Physalaemus spiniger is a species of frog in the family Leptodactylidae.
It is endemic to Brazil.
Its natural habitats are subtropical or tropical moist lowland forests, subtropical or tropical moist shrubland, intermittent freshwater lakes, and intermittent freshwater marshes.
It is threatened by habitat loss.

References

spiniger
Endemic fauna of Brazil
Amphibians of Brazil
Taxonomy articles created by Polbot
Amphibians described in 1926